Saint-Bonnet-près-Orcival (literally Saint-Bonnet near Orcival; Auvergnat: Sent Bonet d'Orcival) is a commune in the Puy-de-Dôme department in Auvergne in central France.

See also
Communes of the Puy-de-Dôme department

References

Saintbonnetpresorcival